Albin Granlund (born 1 September 1989) is a Finnish professional footballer who plays as a right-back for IFK Mariehamn.

Club career
On 20 August 2022, Granlund returned to IFK Mariehamn until the end of the season.

International career
In August 2016, Granlund was named in Finland's squad for a friendly against Germany, but remained an unused substitute. In January 2017, he made his debut in a friendly win over Morocco. He also played in 2018 FIFA World Cup qualifier wins over Iceland and Kosovo.

Granlund was called up for the UEFA Euro 2020 pre-tournament friendly match against Sweden on 29 May 2021.

Honours

Individual
Veikkausliiga Team of the Year: 2016, 2017

References

External links
 
 

1989 births
People from Pargas
Swedish-speaking Finns
Sportspeople from Southwest Finland
Living people
Association football fullbacks
Finnish footballers
Finland international footballers
Rovaniemen Palloseura players
IFK Mariehamn players
Åbo IFK players
Örebro SK players
Stal Mielec players
Veikkausliiga players
Allsvenskan players
Ekstraklasa players
Finnish expatriate footballers
Expatriate footballers in Sweden
Finnish expatriate sportspeople in Sweden
Expatriate footballers in Poland
Finnish expatriate sportspeople in Poland
Pargas Idrottsförening players